Manuel A. Jiménez or "El Canario", (born in Orocovis, Puerto Rico on January 1, 1895 - November 21, 1975), was a Puerto Rican musician most famous for his work in the plena style. During the 1930s, he introduced new elements like piano, horns, and bass into plena, spreading its popularity. Jiménez died on November 21, 1975.

References

External links
 Manuel Jiménez recordings at the Discography of American Historical Recordings.

1895 births
1975 deaths
People from Orocovis, Puerto Rico
20th-century Puerto Rican musicians
Plena
20th-century American musicians